A greased paper window is a very inexpensive window made of paper coated in grease. The grease fills gaps between the paper fibers, reducing the amount of light lost to scattering. Greased paper windows provide a diffuse light source, while blocking wind and preventing insects and other small animals from entering a structure.

Greased paper windows were often used by American pioneers of the early 1800s and other itinerant peoples, in lieu of relatively expensive traditional glass windows. Laura Ingalls Wilder recalled living in a home with a greased paper window in her 1937 children's novel, On the Banks of Plum Creek.

See also
Log cabin
Dugout (shelter)
Sod house
Frosted glass

References

Windows
Itinerant living
Paper
Coated paper